

298001–298100 

|-bgcolor=#f2f2f2
| colspan=4 align=center | 
|}

298101–298200 

|-bgcolor=#f2f2f2
| colspan=4 align=center | 
|}

298201–298300 

|-bgcolor=#f2f2f2
| colspan=4 align=center | 
|}

298301–298400 

|-bgcolor=#f2f2f2
| colspan=4 align=center | 
|}

298401–298500 

|-bgcolor=#f2f2f2
| colspan=4 align=center | 
|}

298501–298600 

|-bgcolor=#f2f2f2
| colspan=4 align=center | 
|}

298601–298700 

|-bgcolor=#f2f2f2
| colspan=4 align=center | 
|}

298701–298800 

|-bgcolor=#f2f2f2
| colspan=4 align=center | 
|}

298801–298900 

|-id=877
| 298877 Michaelreynolds ||  || Michael D. Reynolds (born 1954), an American professor of astronomy and Dean of mathematics and sciences at FSCJ, Florida, as well as director of the Chabot Space and Science Center in California from 1991 to 2002 || 
|}

298901–299000 

|-bgcolor=#f2f2f2
| colspan=4 align=center | 
|}

References 

298001-299000